Kevin Michael Barry Sr.  (14 March 1936 – 12 February 2011) was a New Zealand boxing coach.

He trained numerous New Zealand boxers and was for many years one of the country's top boxing coaches. He was appointed a Member of the Order of the British Empire in the 1995 New Year Honours, and an Officer of the New Zealand Order of Merit in the 2010 New Year Honours. He coached his son Kevin Jr. to a silver medal at the 1984 Olympic Games.

Barry died in Christchurch on 12 February 2011 after a long illness, aged 74.

References

1936 births
2011 deaths
New Zealand boxing trainers
Officers of the New Zealand Order of Merit
New Zealand Members of the Order of the British Empire
New Zealand male boxers